Itarsi Junction railway station (station code: ET) is a junction railway station in Hoshangabad district in Madhya Pradesh from which more than 420 trains pass every day. It is the 8th busiest railway junction in India. It falls under the West Central Railway zone of Indian Railways network. It is one of the most important junction stations, behind Mughalsarai Junction railway station and Nagpur Junction. In 2015 the signal control system was gutted in a fire incident resulting in hundreds of trains being cancelled for over 30 days till normality was restored.

Structure and location
The railway station of Itarsi consists of eight platforms. The platforms are well furnished to meet all passenger needs and demands.

Connectivity
Itarsi Junction railway station is very well connected with rail routes from all four sides. Thus there are trains for almost all the Indian destinations.

Status of arrival and departure of trains at Itarsi junction can be viewed via live station through National Train Enquiry System.

Lines
The tracks on the junction are such that they provide a vast connection to all four directions. To the north lies the important capital city of Madhya Pradesh, Bhopal and the line goes all the way to New Delhi. To the east lies another important railway junction Jabalpur where the line goes all the way to Allahabad and Howrah. The station always holds heavy over-traffic as the trains on the Howrah–Allahabad–Mumbai line and Jhansi––Nagpur routes cross at Itarsi.

Loco sheds
Electric Loco Shed, Itarsi holding WAP-4, WAP-7 & WAG-9 class locomotives. Its sanctioned capacity of holds 175 locomotives. Its former rolling stock were like WAM-4 (all withdrawn or scrapped) & WAG-5 (all transferred to NKJ shed).

It is currently holding 75 WAP-4, 25 WAP-7 & 55 WAG-9.

Diesel Loco Shed, Itarsi also holding Alco & EMD model diesel locomotives, too.

2015 Fire incident 
On 17 June 2015, there was a fire incident on Itarsi Junction involving signal control system resulting in extensive damage to route relay interlocking system (RRI). This resulted in trains being stranded at the station other trains heading towards station being cancelled or diverted. Initially the extent of damage was considered small, but subsequent inspection post fire control found RRI in ashes, beyond repair. A deadline was set to commission new RRI in 35 days. 78 trains were cancelled and 23 diverted by second day alone. Thirty four days disruption resulted in cancellation of 2,044 trains, diversion of 249 trains and short termination of 17 trains. The new RRI installation was completed on 21 July at a cost of Rs. 19.64 cr. Complete normalcy was restored by 26 July 2015.

See also
 
 
 Hoshangabad
 Ghoradongri railway station

References

External links
 Itarsi Junction railway station in pictures
 Itarsi Junction on OpenStreetMap

Railway junction stations in Madhya Pradesh
Bhopal railway division
Railway stations in Hoshangabad district